The Børglum River is a river in Peary Land, Greenland. It is the largest river in Greenland. Administratively it is part of the Northeast Greenland National Park.

The Børglum River Formation is named after the river. Fossils dating back to the Ordovician have been found in it. The Børglum River Formation was deposited in the paleoequatorial marginal seas of Laurentia during the Katian.

Course
The Børglum River is formed on the southern slopes of the Nordkrone. After leaving the mountains it heads roughly southwards across the desolate territories of the western limit of Melville Land, an unglaciated area. Finally it bends southwestwards and joins the left side of the Brønlund Fjord  from its mouth in the Independence Fjord. The river receives many tributaries along its course.

The river was first mapped by Danish Arctic explorer Lauge Koch during his Cartographic Air Expedition of 1938. He named it after the medieval Børglum Abbey in Denmark.

See also
List of rivers of Greenland

References

External links 
Cephalopod assemblages from the Upper Ordovician Børglum River Formation, Peary Land, North Greenland.
Cambrian–Silurian stratigraphy of Børglum Elv, Peary Land, eastern North Greenland

Rivers of Greenland
Peary Land